Seajets is a Greek/Cypriot ferry company operating passenger and freight ferry services in the Aegean Sea.

History
Seajets was established in 1989. Today, it operates a fleet of 14 high speed vessels, and 3 conventional Ro-Ro ferries which services routes from the ports of Piraeus and Rafina to several Cycladic islands. It also sails on routes between Crete (Heraklion - Rethymno) and Central Cyclades (i.e., Santorini, Ios, Naxos, Paros and Mykonos) as well as Northern Greece (Thessaloniki, Sporades), Cyclades and Crete.
In total, Seajets sails to 17 islands and offers 140 connections among them. Most of these routes are seasonal, operating between April and October every year.

In 2020 the company bought seven cruise ships, two of which were soon resold for demolition.

Fleet
, the Seajets fleet consists of the following vessels:

Highspeed ferries

Conventional ferries

Cruise ships
Seajets have acquired several cruise ships, for which their plans are currently unknown.

Former cruise ships
In 2020, Seajets also bought the following cruise ships two of which were resold for demolition and two for further service.

Gallery

Current operations 
Piraeus-Syros-Mykonos-Naxos-Ios-Santorini: Finished for 2022
Piraeus-Sifnos-Serifos-Milos: Finished for 2022
Heraklion-Thira: Finished for 2022
Volos-Skaithos-Skopelos-Alonissos: Sporades Star
Paros-Mykonos-Tinos-Andros-Rafina: SuperStar
Milos-Folegandros-Santorini-Katapola-Koufonisi-Naxos-Mykonos-Paros-Sifnos-Milos-Sifnos-Paros-Mykonos-Naxos-Koufonisi-Katapola-Santorini-Folegandros-Milos-Piraeus:Finished for 2022
Lavrion-Agios Efstratios-Limnos-Kavala: Aqua Blue  
Piraeus-Gytheion-Kythira-Antikythira-Kissamos: Aqua Jewel
Lavrion-Kea-Kythnos-Syros-Tinos-Andros-Karystos-Paros-Naxos-Donousa-Amorgos-Koufonisi-Schoinousa-Irakleia-Folegandros-Sikinos-Ios-Thirassia-Santorini-Anafi : finished for 2022

References

External links

Seajets fleet from ferry-site.dk

Seajets
Transport companies established in 1989
Shipping companies of Greece
Companies based in Piraeus